Korson Palloseura (abbreviated KOPSE) is a football club from Korso in Vantaa, Finland. The club was formed in 1980 and currently has over 800 members. The men's football first team currently plays in the Kutonen (6th Division) and their home ground is at the Aulis Aktia Areena at Jokivarsi.

Background

KOPSE was established in 1980 and to date has played in the lower divisions of the Finnish football league.  Over the last decade the club has oscillated between the Kolmonen (Third Division) and Nelonen (Fourth Division) with 2 promotions and 2 relegations.

Season to season

Club Structure
Korson Palloseura run 25 teams including men's team, ladies team, boys teams, girls teams and adults hobby teams.

2010 season
KOPSE Men's Team are competing in Section 3 (Lohko 3) of the Kolmonen (Third Division) administered by the Uusimaa SPL.  This is the fourth highest tier in the Finnish football system.  In 2009 KOPSE finished in 10th place in Section 3 (Lohko 3) of the Kolmonen.

 KOPSE / 2 are competing in Section 5 (Lohko 5) of the Vitonen (Fifth Division) administered by the Uusimaa SPL.

 KOPSE / 3 are competing in Section 5 (Lohko 5) of the Kutonen (Sixth Division) administered by the Uusimaa SPL.

References and Sources
 Official Website
Finnish Wikipedia
Suomen Cup

Footnotes

Football clubs in Finland
Sport in Vantaa
1980 establishments in Finland